Alfred Emil Fredrik Sandström (1886, Nyköping, Sweden – 1962) was a Swedish lawyer. He was the chairman of the International Federation of Red Cross and Red Crescent Societies from 1950 to 1959.

Life
In the course of his career he was, among other things, a judge in the Supreme Court, at the Permanent Court of Arbitration in the Hague as well as at the so-called mixed courts that existed in Egypt until 1949 and settled disputes between Egyptians and foreigners. He also acted as an international mediator on many occasions - for example, as Swedish representative (and, from June 1947, Chairman) on the United Nations Special Committee on Palestine (UNSCOP), an attempt by the United Nations to test out the situation in Palestine during the termination of the British Mandate. In addition he succeeded Folke Bernadotte as president of the Swedish Red Cross

In 1950, Emil Sandström became a member of the Institut de Droit International (institute for international law).

References

External links 
Red Cross Biography

1886 births
1962 deaths
Red Cross personnel
Members of the Institut de Droit International
Presidents of the International Federation of Red Cross and Red Crescent Societies
Grand Crosses with Star and Sash of the Order of Merit of the Federal Republic of Germany
Justices of the Supreme Court of Sweden
20th-century Swedish judges
20th-century Swedish lawyers